Kanad Hospital (formerly known as Oasis Hospital) was established in Al Ain, United Arab Emirates, by Drs. Pat and Marian Kennedy in 1960. It is the oldest hospital in the Abu Dhabi Emirate, and the second oldest in the entire nation of UAE. Owned by True Sojourners, a U.S.-based humanitarian organization, Kanad is a not-for-profit hospital that is committed to and known for providing exceptional, whole-person healthcare with the love and compassion of Jesus Christ.

History 
The success of Bahrain’s American Mission Hospital (c. 1903) and Oman’s Al-Rahma Hospital (c. 1909) was well known in Arabia in the first half of the twentieth century. The hospitals, founded by the Reformed Church in America at the invitation of local rulers, were known to treat tens of thousands of patients annually, saving countless lives. In 1959, facing a desperate situation with approximately 50% infant mortality and 33% maternal mortality, Abu Dhabi’s ruler Sheikh Shakhbout bin Sultan Al Nahyan and his brother Sheikh Zayed, who would become the founding father of the UAE, put out a call to bring a similar medical establishment to Al Ain. That call was answered by American physicians Dr. Burwell “Pat” Kennedy and his wife Dr. Marian Kennedy, who had previously worked in Iraq, Lebanon and Jordan. 

Dr. Pat made his initial scouting visit to Al Ain in December of 1959, followed by a second visit in April 1960, the purpose of which was to make final preparations for bringing his family and supplies later in the year. On that visit, however, a woman who had been in labor for two days was brought to him. She was seeking help, and it was a prime opportunity for Sheikh Shakhbout and Sheikh Zayed to observe and examine Dr. Kennedy’s ability. Not expecting to actually practice medicine on this preparatory trip, Dr. Kennedy did not have any medical supplies with him. However, at Sheikh Zayed’s insistence, Kennedy walked over to the Land Rover that had just transported he and his colleague Raymond Joyce across nine hours of sand dunes from the Dubai airport. Taking out a small hose from the engine, he carefully washed it with water from a well.  Kennedy was then able to use the makeshift device to deliver a healthy baby boy just moments later! Looking on in astonishment, the royal family of Abu Dhabi needed no further convincing that they had found their doctor. 

And so, on November 20, 1960, the Kennedy family, accompanied by Maria Mayer, arrived in Al Ain to establish Oasis Hospital (officially renamed “Kanad Hospital” in 2019 by HH Sheikh Mohamed bin Zayed to perpetuate its unique legacy by acknowledging the local Arabic dialect for “Kennedy hospital”). The first and only hospital in the entire Abu Dhabi Emirate, Oasis served not only Al Ain and its surrounding areas, but also Al Buraimi and the coastal and interior regions of Oman. It would be nearly another decade before the first government hospital was established in the Emirate, leaving Oasis as the sole provider of healthcare to those in the region. Of all the births at the hospital during that first year in the desert, none would be more consequential than the tenth baby to be born. For on March 11, 1961, Sheikh Zayed and Sheikha Fatima welcomed a baby boy, born at the hands of Dr. Marian Kennedy, that they named Mohamed. At that time, only God knew that young Mohamed would go on to become the beloved third president of a nation that did not even exist yet – the United Arab Emirates. President Sheikh Mohamed was the first of twenty-three sons and daughters of Sheikh Zayed to be born at Kanad, which is why the hospital became known as the “birthplace of the nation’s leaders.”

Facilities 
Kanad Hospital started with a basic facility in 1960, the guest house donated by Sheikh Zayed. One corner of rooms was dedicated to labor and delivery, operations, sterilizing and storage, plus an additional VIP patients’ room, complete with its own outside door into the courtyard. There were four patients’ rooms made of palm branches built right outside the wall beside the delivery room. It was compact and efficient, but it was exactly what was needed at the time. There was enough space to have a separate room for each patient so that men and family could visit in private, and there was also a small, communal courtyard where groups could sit and sip coffee together.  

However, this was all destroyed by heavy rains in February and March of 1963. Typically mud-block buildings could withstand some rain, but after seven years with no rain, the sun and wind had begun to wear down many buildings, including the guest house. The heavy rain in that season simply washed away the corners of rooms, leaving them exposed to the outside world. This gave way for the hospital to make its move to a new site of prefabricated buildings. There were eight rooms made of palm branches and corrugated aluminum, but these were also destroyed just a few short months later in October. 

The men were immediately tasked with rebuilding the rooms. They planned to start with four mud-block rooms and hoped to continue building with cement blocks in the near future. They made the mud-blocks by hand right there on the property, using clay soil. They left them in the sun to dry, and then that night it unexpectedly rained and washed them all away. Once again, they were faced with starting from scratch.  

In January 1964, Leon Blosser arrived with his family and his first assignment was to build what would be the first cement block building in Al Ain. No one had ever built using cement blocks before in Al Ain, so locals trickled in and out just to watch. The cement had to be brought from Dubai, and Leon crafted his own cement block machine, using an old truck chassis and standing it on its end. He hauled gravel from the wadi and sand from the desert, then fashioned all the blocks by hand. On Gerry Longjohn’s very first day later that year, he started helping Leon complete the hospital’s first inpatient building of 20 rooms. In addition, Gerry also built a majlis, or “meeting room,” for the hospital, the first cement-block residences, and the X-ray building which included a basement for cool storage of pharmaceutical supplies.  

In 1972, another 10 patient rooms were added, which included private baths. In 1985, work started on new inpatient rooms for the obstetric, surgical, and pediatric suites, and by 1990 these were completed and in use. At the end of 1993, the original cement-block rooms were demolished, and the new outpatient building was built and opened in 1995. Further expansions took place in the early 2000’s, including the Sheikh Zayed Majlis, which is a replica of the original building and is dedicated to preserving the history of Al Ain. In 2015, the hospital opened its new state-of-the-art, 140-bed facility, complete with the UAE’s most advanced maternal and fetal medicine clinic and neonatal intensive care unit. While the new building was a gracious gift from the UAE government, it is worthwhile to note that Kanad does not receive ongoing government funding. Its operating budget is the source of all revenue for the world-class healthcare it provides. Kanad Hospital has come a long way from its humble beginnings, and it continues to develop and expand alongside the community.

References 

Hospital buildings completed in 1960
Hospitals in the United Arab Emirates
Hospitals established in 1960
Buildings and structures in Al Ain